This is a timeline documenting events of Jazz in the year 1911.

Events

March 
 18 – The Irving Berlin album Alexander's Ragtime Band was released.

Unknown date 
 The composer and pianist Scott Joplin published his opera Treemonisha.

Standards

Births

 January
 25 – Truck Parham, American upright bassist (died 2002).
 30
 Roy Eldridge, American jazz trumpeter (died 1989).
 Frank Weir, British orchestra leader and saxophonist (died 1981).

 March
 7 — Louis Cottrell Jr., American clarinetist and tenor saxophonist (died 1978).
 10 – Pete Clarke, British saxophonist and clarinetist (died 1975).
 16 – Harper Goff,  Afro-Cuban clarinetist, saxophonist, and trumpeter (died 1993).
 31 – Freddie Green, American guitarist (died 1987).

 April
 2 — Cag Cagnolatti, American trumpeter (died 1983).
 12 – Tullio Mobiglia, Italian saxophonist and bandleader (died 1991).
 16 – Alton Purnell, American pianist (died 1987).
 21
 John G. Blowers Jr. or Johnny Blowers, American drummer (died 2006).
 Zilas Görling, Swedish saxophonist (died 1960).
 28
 Mario Bauza, American artist, musician, and actor (died 1993).
 Norma Teagarden, American pianist (died 1996).

 May
 8 — Robert Johnson, American guitarist, singer, and composer (died 1938).
 13 – Billy Munn, British jazz pianist and arranger (died 2000).
 13 – Maxine Sullivan, American vocalist and performer (died 1987).
 18 – Big Joe Turner, American blues shouter (died 1985).

 July
 7 — Charles Redland, Swedish saxophonist, bandleader, and composer (died 1994).
 10 – Cootie Williams, American trumpeter (died 1985).
 17 – Lionel Ferbos, American trumpeter (died 2014).
 23 – Lodewijk Parisius "Kid Dynamite", Surinamese-Dutch tenor saxophonist (died 1963).

 August
 20 – Billy Amstell, British reedist (died 2005).
 28 – George Clarke, American tenor saxophonist (died 1985).

 September
 30 – Clare Deniz, British pianist (died 2002).

 October
 7 — Jo Jones, American drummer (died 1985).
 8 — Karel Vlach, Czech musician, orchestra conductor, and arranger (died 1986).
 26 – Mahalia Jackson, American singer (died 1972).

 November
 11 – Dick Wilson, American jazz tenor saxophonist (died 1941).
 12 – Buck Clayton, American trumpeter (died 1991).
 17 – Max Miller, American pianist and vibraphonist (died 1985).
 21 – Alvin Burroughs, American drummer (died 1950).
 22 – Ernie Caceres, American saxophonist (died 1971).

 December
 14 – Spike Jones, American musician and bandleader (died 1965).
 15 – Stan Kenton, American pianist, composer, arranger, and band leader (died 1979).
 19 – Lu Watters, American trumpeter and band leader, Yerba Buena Jazz Band (died 1989).

 UNknown date
 Aldo Rossi, Italian reedist and bandleader (died 1980).

References

External links
 History Of Jazz Timeline: 1911 at All About Jazz

Jazz by year
Jazz, 1911 In